Shakalya was an ancient Indian grammarian and scholar of Vedic period who is supposed to have revised the Vedic texts and written their Pada-pāṭha. He is often quoted by Pāṇini and the writers of the Prātiśākhya,  treatises on phonetics. His Padapāṭha of the Rig Veda was one of the early attempts in the direction of analysis; he broke down the samhita text of the Rig Veda into words, identifying even the separate elements of compound words.

References 

Ancient Sanskrit grammarians